The 2004 Cheltenham Gold Cup was a horse race which took place at Cheltenham on Thursday, 18 March 2004. It was the 76th running of the Cheltenham Gold Cup, and it was won by the pre-race favourite Best Mate. The winner was ridden by Jim Culloty and trained by Henrietta Knight.

With his third successive Gold Cup victory Best Mate became the fourth horse to win the race three times or more, and he was the first triple-winner since Arkle in the mid-1960s.

Race details
 Sponsor: Totesport
 Winner's prize money: £203,000.00
 Going: Good
 Number of runners: 10
 Winner's time: 6m 42.6s

Full result

* The distances between the horses are shown in lengths or shorter. PU = pulled-up.† Trainers are based in Great Britain unless indicated.

Winner's details
Further details of the winner, Best Mate:

 Foaled: 28 January 1995, in Ireland
 Sire: Un Desperado; Dam: Katday (Miller's Mate)
 Owner: Jim Lewis
 Breeder: Jacques Van't Hart

References
 
 sportinglife.com
 telegraph.co.uk – "Best Mate leaps into history" – March 19, 2004.

Cheltenham Gold Cup
 2004
Cheltenham Gold Cup
Cheltenham Gold Cup
2000s in Gloucestershire